Camp Century was an Arctic United States military scientific research base in Greenland. situated  east of Thule Air Base. When built, Camp Century was publicized as a demonstration for affordable ice-cap military outposts and a base for scientific research.

Camp Century was a preliminary camp for Project Iceworm whose end goal was to install a vast network of nuclear missile launch sites that could survive a first strike. This was according to documents declassified in 1996.  The missiles were never fielded and necessary consent from the Danish Government to do so was never broached.

The camp operated from 1959 until 1967. Project Iceworm was aborted after it was realized that the ice sheet was not as stable as originally assessed, and that the missile basing concept would not be feasible. The reactor was removed and Camp Century later abandoned. However, hazardous waste remains buried under the ice and has become an environmental concern.

Scientific research
Ice core samples from Camp Century were used to create stable isotopes analyses used to develop climate models. Analysis of soil contained in the samples suggests that the site was ice-free as recently as 400,000 years ago, indicating a much reduced Greenland ice sheet and therefore much higher sea levels. Since 2017, the Geological Survey of Denmark and Greenland has maintained a climate monitoring presence at Camp Century with the Camp Century Climate Monitoring Program. This monitoring presence includes measuring climate variables, snow and ice temperatures, and ice-penetrating radar surveys of the subsurface debris and contaminant field.

History
The purpose of Camp Century, as explained by the United States Department of Defense to Danish officials in 1960, was to test various construction techniques under Arctic conditions, explore practical problems with the PM-2A semi-mobile nuclear reactor, as well as supporting scientific experiments on the icecap.

Construction on the camp and the sub-glacial nuclear reactor began without explicit permission from the government of Denmark, leading to a political dilemma for Prime Minister H. C. Hansen.

The camp ran until 1967, when shifting icecaps made habitation impossible. The camp was subsequently abandoned and the facility's remains were buried by the icecaps and ultimately crushed.

Design and performance

Camp Century was designed as an arctic subsurface camp and constructed by use of the cut-and-cover trenching technique. The layout of the camp consisted of a series of parallel main trenches in which buildings and other structures were housed. The camp had a design life span of 10 years with appropriate maintenance. It was permanently manned for 5 years and abandoned after 8 years.

The trenches constructed in 1959 had compressed both vertically and horizontally to the extent that many had reached their design margins within 4 years. After that, extensive snow trimming was required to maintain the trenches.

The subsurface camp provided good protection from the elements and had modern bathroom, dining, and medical facilities. Prefabricated buildings were placed inside the trenches. The camp maintained a number of vehicles and had plenty of storage for fuel and food. The reactor provided plenty of power and proved it could be installed, operated, and removed in such a remote location. It powered the base for over 3 years but was shut down due to the unexpected accelerated compression of the reactor trenches, in part due to the residual heat in the reactor area required to maintain the feed water pools.

The snow trimming required to maintain the trenches, and sewage disposal were both ongoing problems. As a result, the odor of sewage became almost unbearable in the nearest quarters after the first year of operation. Subsequent venting of the sump reduced the odor but did not eliminate the condition. Thus odor from the sump affected nearby trenches with sleeping quarters and also accelerated trench deformation.

In Oct 1965 the US Army concluded that subsurface ice camps are feasible and practical, that nuclear power offers significant advantages, and that the wealth of data and experience obtained from Camp Century will be of inestimable value in future designs.  However, on permanent snow fields it is elevated structures that are in common use today.  No large subsurface ice camps are known to have been constructed after Camp Century was abandoned.

Residual environmental hazards 
When the camp was decommissioned in 1967, its infrastructure and waste were abandoned under the assumption they would be entombed forever by perpetual snowfall.

In 2016, a group of scientists evaluated the environmental impact and estimated that due to changing weather patterns over the next few decades, melt water could release the nuclear waste, 200,000 liters of diesel fuel, a nontrivial quantity of PCBs, and 24 million liters of untreated sewage into the environment as early as the year 2090.  Transition in ice sheet surface mass balance at Camp Century from net accumulation to net ablation is plausible within the next 75 years under one climate model, and after another 44 to 88 years the buried wastes could be exposed between 2135 and 2179.

Climate models differ. A Norwegian climate model suite (NorESM1) shows that increased snow fall is not overcome by increased melting, so the remains of the base would become deeper under the ice. A Canadian model suite (CanESM2), gives an anticipated 2090 solid waste depth of 67 m, and between 44 and 88 years of persistent ablation that would be required to melt all overlying granular snow and expose wastes at the ice sheet surface. In either scenario, eventually highly diluted contaminates in melt water could be released at the coast 250 km away, but even then it would be in the 22nd century or later.

A more recent 2021 assessment of the future evolution of Camp Century shows meltwater never reaches the base, in fact not penetrating more than 1.1 meters.  It again shows there is no chance for remobilization of debris and contaminants before year 2100. Projections now have been adjusted with actual weather measurements from the station at Camp Century. This latter study, uses versions of the CanEMS2 and RACMO2 climate models that are calibrated to climate observations at Camp Century. William Colgan, project leader of the Camp Century Climate Monitoring Programme of the Geological Survey of Denmark and Greenland, conclusively states "Since the amount of annual snow will continue to exceed the annual melting, the mapped debris field will continue to be buried deeper in the Greenland ice sheet. In other words: there is no risk that the debris will come to the surface due to melting before 2100".

See also
 Army Nuclear Power Program

References

Further reading 
  The original news story.
 
 
 
 
 Thule Air Base/Camp Century information
 U.S. Army Corps of Engineers, Cold Regions Research and Engineering, Camp Century Evolution of Concept and History of Design Construction and Performance, Technical report 174

Military installations of the United States in Greenland
Glaciology of the United States
1959 establishments in Greenland
Military installations closed in the 1960s